The 2011 Elimination Chamber (known as No Way Out in Germany) was the second Elimination Chamber professional wrestling pay-per-view (PPV) event produced by World Wrestling Entertainment (WWE). It was held for wrestlers from the promotion's Raw and SmackDown brand divisions. The event took place on February 20, 2011, at the Oracle Arena in Oakland, California. This was the last Elimination Chamber held under the first brand extension, which ended in August, but was reinstated in July 2016.

The concept of the event was that the two main event matches occurred in the Elimination Chamber. The main event was Raw's Elimination Chamber match, in which John Cena defeated CM Punk, John Morrison, R-Truth, Randy Orton, and Sheamus to become the number one contender for the WWE Championship at WrestleMania XXVII. In SmackDown's Elimination Chamber match, Edge retained the World Heavyweight Championship against Big Show, Drew McIntyre, Kane, Rey Mysterio, and Wade Barrett. On the undercard, The Corre (Justin Gabriel and Heath Slater) defeated Santino Marella and Vladimir Kozlov to win the WWE Tag Team Championship, and The Miz retained the WWE Championship against Jerry Lawler.

The event received 212,000 buys, lower than the 287,000 buys that the previous year's event received.

Production

Background
In 2010, World Wrestling Entertainment (WWE) held an event titled Elimination Chamber as a gimmick pay-per-view that replaced their previous event, No Way Out. The concept of the show was that the two main event matches were contested inside the Elimination Chamber, with Raw's WWE Championship and SmackDown's World Heavyweight Championship, respectively, at stake in each. The following year, WWE scheduled a second event to be held on February 20, 2011, at the Oracle Arena in Oakland, California, thus establishing Elimination Chamber as a recurring pay-per-view. It featured wrestlers from the Raw and SmackDown brands.

The Elimination Chamber name was chosen by a fan poll, however, the inaugural show was promoted as "No Way Out" in Germany as it was feared that the name "Elimination Chamber" may remind people of the gas chambers used during the Holocaust. For 2011, it was renamed to "No Escape" for the German broadcast.

Storylines
The professional wrestling matches at Elimination Chamber featured professional wrestlers performing as characters in scripted events pre-determined by the hosting promotion, WWE. Storylines between the characters were produced on WWE's weekly television shows Raw and SmackDown of the Raw and SmackDown brands—storyline divisions in which WWE assigned its employees to different programs.

After The Miz won the WWE Championship in November 2010, Raw commentator Jerry Lawler was given what was billed as his first WWE Championship match, after criticizing Miz's win by using his Money in the Bank briefcase while former champion Randy Orton was injured. He lost to Miz in a TLC match after his fellow commentator Michael Cole stopped Lawler from climbing the ladder. On the January 31 episode of Raw, the Raw general manager announced a Raw Rumble match, to determine the WWE Championship contender at Elimination Chamber, while the losing participants would be entered into an Elimination Chamber match to determine who will face the WWE Champion at WrestleMania XXVII. The participants were CM Punk, Randy Orton, King Sheamus, John Morrison, John Cena, Jerry Lawler, and R-Truth. Lawler last eliminated Sheamus to win the battle royal to earn himself the title match, while the other six contestants went on to participate in the Raw Elimination Chamber match.

At the Royal Rumble, Alberto Del Rio won the eponymous match to earn himself a World Championship match at WrestleMania. He subsequently announced he would wrestle for the World Heavyweight Championship, held at the time by Edge. Edge was then embroiled in a feud with Dolph Ziggler and his on-screen ex-wife Vickie Guerrero, who was also scripted to be dating Ziggler. The week before the Elimination Chamber Edge and Kelly Kelly defeated Ziggler and LayCool, causing Guerrero to fire Kelly Kelly. At the pay-per-view, Kelly Kelly was rehired by Teddy Long and attacked Vickie, but was stopped by Laycool, who in turn was stopped by Trish Stratus. On the final episode of SmackDown before the pay-per-view, acting general manager Guerrero stripped Edge of the championship and awarded it to Ziggler, only for Theodore Long, the real general manager, to give Edge a return match which he won. After this, Long fictitiously Kayfabe fired Ziggler leaving an open spot in the Elimination Chamber match (which was subsequently filled by Big Show). The other participants were Kane, Rey Mysterio, Wade Barrett and Drew McIntyre. After that event, Edge and Kelly Kelly defeated Drew McIntyre and Vickie Guerrero thus making Theodore Long fire Vickie Guerrero as the official consultant of SmackDown.

Event

Preliminary matches
The event opened with Alberto Del Rio facing Intercontinental Champion Kofi Kingston. Del Rio forced Kingston to submit to the Cross Armbreaker to win the match.

Next was the Elimination Chamber match for the World Heavyweight Championship involving Edge, Rey Mysterio, Kane, Drew McIntyre, Big Show and Wade Barrett. Edge and Mysterio started the match. Barrett entered at #3, Kane entered at #4, McIntyre entered at #5 and Big Show entered at #6. Barrett was eliminated by Big Show after a KO Punch. Big Show was eliminated by Kane after a Chokeslam. McIntyre was eliminated by Kane after a Chokeslam. Kane was eliminated by Edge after a Spear. Edge executed a Spear on Mysterio for a near-fall. Mysterio executed a 619 and a Slingshot Splash on Edge for a near-fall. Mysterio executed another 619 and leapt off the top rope but Edge performed a Spear on Mysterio in mid-air to eliminate him and retain the title. After the match, Alberto Del Rio attacked Edge but Christian returned and attacked Del Rio, ending the attack with a Killswitch.

After that, Santino Marella and Vladimir Kozlov defended the WWE Tag Team Championship against The Corre (Heath Slater and Justin Gabriel). Gabriel performed a 450 Splash on Kozlov to win the title.

In the fourth match, The Miz faced Jerry Lawler for the WWE Championship. During the match, Lawler performed a Diving Fist Drop on Miz but Miz placed his foot on the bottom rope to void the pinfall. The Miz performed a Skull Crushing Finale on Lawler to retain the title.

Main event
The main event was an Elimination Chamber match for a WWE Championship match at Wrestlemania XXVII between CM Punk, Randy Orton, King Sheamus, John Morrison, John Cena and R-Truth. Sheamus and Morrison started the match while the other four men were locked inside pods. Orton entered at #3 and Punk entered at #4 but Punk's pod would not open, allowing Orton to attack Punk. Punk was eliminated by Orton after an RKO but the Anonymous Raw General Manager announced that Punk would re-enter the match. Cena entered at #4 and R-Truth entered at #5. R-Truth was eliminated by Sheamus after a Brogue Kick. Punk entered at #6 and eliminated Orton after a GTS. Sheamus was eliminated by Morrison after a Crossbody from the top of the chamber. Morrison was eliminated by Punk after a GTS. Cena eliminated Punk after an Attitude Adjustment onto the chamber floor to win a WWE Championship match at Wrestlemania XXVII.

Aftermath 
After becoming #1 Contender to the WWE Championship, John Cena faced The Miz for the title at WrestleMania XXVII. The match ended in a double count-out but The Rock used his power as WrestleMania host to restart the match under no disqualifications and no count-outs. The Miz defeated Cena to retain the WWE Championship after The Rock hit Cena with a Rock Bottom. This would lead both Cena and The Rock to challenge each other to a match at WrestleMania XXVIII, which The Rock won.

After Elimination Chamber, Edge defended the World Heavyweight Championship against Alberto Del Rio at WrestleMania XXVII where Edge retained. On the April 11 episode of Raw, Edge retired from professional wrestling due to a legit neck injury and relinquished the World Heavyweight Championship on the April 15 episode of SmackDown, thus retiring as World Heavyweight Champion. Edge's best friend Christian would go on to win the vacant title against Del Rio in a ladder match at Extreme Rules. That reign would only last 2 days, as on May 3, during the taping for the May 6 edition of SmackDown, Christian lost the title to Randy Orton.

The 2011 event would be the final Elimination Chamber held during the first brand split, which ended in August. However, the brand split was reinstated in July 2016, and the following year's Elimination Chamber event was SmackDown-exclusive. Additionally, in April, the promotion ceased using its full name with the "WWE" abbreviation becoming an orphaned initialism.

Results

Elimination Chamber entrances and eliminations (SmackDown)

Elimination Chamber entrances and eliminations (Raw)

References

External links
Official Elimination Chamber website

2011 in California
2011
Events in Oakland, California
Professional wrestling in California
2011 WWE pay-per-view events
February 2011 events in the United States

es:WWE Elimination Chamber#2011